Marie's Story is a 2014 French biographical film directed by Jean-Pierre Améris and written by Améris and Philippe Blasband. It is based on the true story of Marie Heurtin (1885–1921), a girl who was born deaf and blind in late 19th century France. The film won the Variety Piazza Grande Award at the 67th Locarno International Film Festival.

Story
In 1885, Marie Heurtin, the daughter of a humble artisan and his wife, is born deaf and blind and unable to communicate with the world around her. Desperate to find a connection with Marie and avoid sending her to an asylum, the Heurtins send her to the Larnay Institute in central France, where an order of Catholic nuns manage a school for deaf girls. There, the idealistic Sister Marguerite sees in Marie a unique potential and, despite her Mother Superior's skepticism, vows to bring the wild girl out of the darkness into which she was born.

Background
Marie's Story is based on the true story of Marie Heurtin, who continued her education at the institute and lived there until her death at the age of 36.

Cast 
 Ariana Rivoire as Marie Heurtin 
 Isabelle Carré as Sister Marguerite 
 Brigitte Catillon as Mother Superior 
 Noémie Churlet as Sister Raphaëlle 
 Gilles Treton as Monsieur Heurtin 
 Laure Duthilleul as Madame Heurtin 
 Martine Gautier as Sister Véronique 
 Patricia Legrand as Sister Joseph 
 Sonia Laroze as Sister Elisabeth 
 Valérie Leroux as Sister Blandine 
 Fany Buy as Sister Marthe 
 Noémie Bianco as Sister Anne 
 Eline De Lorenzi as Sister Clothilde 
 Tiphaine Rabaud Fournier as Sister Marie-Ange

Production 
Shooting for the filming took place in Ain – including Montluel and Hauteville-Lompnes – as well as in Isère.

See also

List of films featuring the deaf and hard of hearing

References

External links 
 

2014 films
2014 biographical drama films
2010s French-language films
French biographical drama films
French Sign Language films
Films about deaf people
Films about blind people
Films about educators
Drama films based on actual events
Films directed by Jean-Pierre Améris
2014 drama films
Films shot in Ain
Films shot in Isère
2010s French films
Films about Catholic nuns
Films about disability